OPA is a mixture of isopropyl alcohol and isopropylamine that is used for production of the sarin nerve agent. The mixture reacts with methylphosphonyl difluoride to produce sarin.

Reference

Nerve agent precursors
Chemical warfare agent mixtures